Daniel Benjamin "Dan" Shapiro (born August 1, 1969) is an American diplomat who served as United States Ambassador to Israel from 2011 to 2017. He was nominated by President Barack Obama on March 29, 2011, and confirmed by the Senate on May 29. He was sworn in as ambassador by Secretary of State Hillary Clinton on July 8, 2011.
Previously, he was the senior director for the Middle East and North Africa on the United States National Security Council. As an Obama administration political appointee, Shapiro was ordered on January 5, 2017, to resign upon the inauguration of President Donald Trump. On August 30, 2021, President Joe Biden appointed Shapiro as a special liaison to Israel on Iran.

Biography 
Dan Shapiro was born to a Jewish family in Champaign, Illinois, one of four children of novelist Elizabeth Klein Shapiro and University of Illinois English professor emeritus Michael Shapiro. He went to Westview Elementary and Edison Middle school in Champaign, and graduated from the University Laboratory High School in 1986. He first entered Washington University in St. Louis, spending his sophomore year in Israel, and then transferred to Brandeis University, where he obtained a bachelor's degree in 1991 in Near Eastern and Judaic Studies. Two years later he earned a master's degree in Middle Eastern Politics from Harvard University.

Shapiro speaks both Hebrew and Arabic.

Shapiro is married to Julie Fisher. The couple has three daughters. They are members of the Conservative Jewish Adas Israel Congregation in Washington.

Career
From 1993 to 1995, Shapiro served as a professional staff member on the House Foreign Affairs Committee under Chairman Lee H. Hamilton. From 1995 to 1999, he was a legislative assistant and senior foreign policy adviser to Senator Dianne Feinstein. From 1999 to 2001, he sat on the National Security Council under President Bill Clinton, as director of legislative affairs, and as a Congressional liaison for National Security Adviser Sandy Berger. From 2001 to 2007, he was first legislative adviser and then deputy chief of staff (primarily on foreign policy issues) for U.S. Senator Bill Nelson. From 2007 till 2008, he was vice president of the Washington, D.C., lobbying firm Timmons & Company.

Shapiro had served as an advisor to then-U.S. Sen. Barack Obama on Middle East and Jewish community issues since 2007, also assisting as strategist and fundraiser. He accompanied Obama on his July 2008 trip to Israel; in August 2008, Obama appointed him senior policy adviser and Jewish outreach coordinator for his 2008 presidential campaign.

In January 2009, Shapiro was appointed senior director for the Middle East and North Africa of the U.S. National Security Council. Focusing on Israel, he attended every Israel-related meeting, and met with every senior Israeli diplomat and military officer who visited Washington, D.C. Shapiro often accompanied U.S. Special Envoy for Middle East Peace George J. Mitchell on his trips to the region, and played a central role in talks regarding the Middle East Peace Process and the strengthening of military cooperation between the U.S. and Israel. He maintained close relations with Benyamin Netanyahu, in spite of tensions between the Israeli prime minister and President Obama. In June 2011, he was appointed Ambassador to Israel. Shapiro took leave of the President of Israel, Reuven Rivlin, on January 17, 2017 before holding his final meeting with Netanyahu two days later, which one newspaper described as a "terse farewell."

After concluding his service as ambassador to Israel, Shapiro became a Distinguished Visiting Fellow at the Institute for National Security Studies at Tel Aviv University. Shapiro is currently a principal at WestExec Advisors.

References

External links 

 
 

1969 births
20th-century American Jews
Ambassadors of the United States to Israel
American lobbyists
Brandeis University alumni
Harvard University alumni
Living people
Obama administration personnel
People from Champaign, Illinois
United States National Security Council staffers
21st-century American Jews
University Laboratory High School (Urbana, Illinois) alumni